John Gorman is a radio personality, executive, and author from Cleveland, Ohio. In 2007, Gorman published his first book, The Buzzard: Inside The Glory Days of WMMS and Cleveland Rock Radio.

Early years

John Gorman was born in Massachusetts. At the age of 12, he first began operating a private radio station from his family home. As a teenager, he worked in the commercial radio industry as a programming assistant, music director, and talk show producer where he remained until his move to Cleveland in 1973.

Career and achievements
John Gorman worked at WMMS for 13 years n Cleveland where he adjusted the format of WMMS based upon a broad interpretation of the category of rock and roll music.

Gorman was awarded "The Radio Consultant of The Year" (1985) at the Annual Pop Music Convention. He was also named "Operations Director of The Year" by Billboard (magazine) in 1995. In 2006, he received the Perseverance award from the Cleveland Entertainment Coalition.

In 2000, Gorman was inducted into the Broadcaster's Hall of Fame. Gorman was also inducted into the Cleveland Association of Broadcaster' Hall of Fame in April 2008. He was inducted into the Rock Radio Hall of Fame in the "Legends of Rock Radio–Programming" category for his work at WMMS in 2014.

In 2015, Gorman was the chief content officer of oWOW Radio, an Internet radio station based in Cleveland. oWOW Radio was taken off the air in January 2021.

Bibliography
Gorman, John (2007). The Buzzard: Inside the Glory Days of WMMS and Cleveland Rock Radio—A Memoir. Cleveland, OH: Gray & Company, Publishers.

References

External links

BuzzardBook.WordPress.com

1950 births
Living people
Radio personalities from Boston
Boston College alumni
Writers from Cleveland